Smoke Works Boston, also known as Smoke Works, Smoke Works Injection Alternatives, or Smoke Works Harm Reduction, is a glass pipe distributor and mutual aid initiative based in Massachusetts.

Smoke Works incorporates pipes into needle exchange programs across the country in order to increase the accessibility of harm reduction services to people who use stimulants.

Between 2020 and 2022, Smoke Works distributed 200,000 pipes to various programs that hope to connect drug users to health services.

In November 2021, National Harm Reduction Coalition issued Smoke Works Boston the Innovation in Harm Reduction award. In October 2022, Smoke Works presented at the 13th National Harm Reduction Conference in San Juan, Puerto Rico.

History 
Smoke Works was founded by harm reduction advocate and former stimulant-user, Jim Duffy and his co-worker, Nate. When he was using, Duffy mainly smoked meth, but would inject it on occasion. Duffy credits the guidance of injection drug-users that frequented needle exchanges with saving his life. These interactions were his first meaningful experience with harm reduction, though he didn't learn the official term 'harm reduction' until years later, when he was sober.

Duffy became involved in public health work through his own chaotic experiences as an HIV-positive person using and recovering from drugs, specifically methamphetamine. Duffy learned the term 'harm reduction'  through the needle exchange Access, Harm Reduction, Overdose Prevention and Education (AHOPE), which is run through the Boston Public Health Commission. Duffy began working at AHOPE in 2018. He was surprised at the number of low-threshold services offered to clients through AHOPE, and said the program taught clients everything he wished he knew about drugs when he was using. Duffy noticed that AHOPE, and similar programs, were mainly serving intravenous drug-users to the detriment of people who use drugs via other routes of administration.

The lack of engagement with non-injection drug-users concerned Duffy, who noticed that the number of people who used drugs, in the Mass and Cass neighborhood where he worked, was much larger than the number of people who regularly used AHOPE's services. Duffy believed many non-injecting drug users were unaware of the extent of services AHOPE offered, beyond exchanging syringes, and were missing out on valuable life-changing resources. This need inspired Duffy and Nate to create Smoke Works.

Duffy and Nate began connecting with harm reduction organizations around the country to research pipe distribution. They spoke with harm reduction workers who were giving pipes to stimulant-users legally, illegally, and with legal ambiguity. Through these conversations, Duffy and Nate learned low-paid outreach workers were spending their own money to provide clients with pipes, in an unsustainable attempt to address the needs of stimulant-users.

Smoke Works and other harm reduction organizations created and joined a buyer's group to access significantly reduced prices on pipes. When the buyer's group became unsustainable, Smoke Works transitioned to direct sales of pipes in order to afford the maintenance and expansion of their harm reduction work.

Smoke Works sells primarily to well-funded organizations, such as Public Health Departments. Once overhead and operating costs are covered by pipe sales, Smoke Works uses remaining profits to offer discounts to underfunded harm reduction efforts and supply free pipes to unfunded harm reduction efforts. The project also donates to various mutual aid efforts. The initiative's use of cost-sharing and mutual aid models makes free pipes available at syringe exchange programs across the United States.

Efforts 
In February 2022, SOL Collective, a Philadelphia harm reduction collective working to end the overdose crisis, credited Smoke Works Boston with providing 140 new pipes weekly to drug-users in Philly.

In August 2022, organizations from five major US cities, including Smoke Works Boston, contributed to a proposal by the Albuquerque Health Care for the Homeless Harm Reduction and Outreach Team requesting funding for safer smoking kits from the New Mexico Department of Health.

In November 2022, Smoke Works presented Meeting People Where They Are With Equipment: Safer Use Supplies in Medical Settings at a conference hosted by The Association for Multidisciplinary Education and Research in Substance use and Addiction.

Smoke Works has provided harm reduction supplies to thousands of people who use drugs in Portland, New Hampshire, Aurora, Seattle, Fort Wayne, Indianapolis, Oklahoma, Eugene, Los Angeles, San Francisco Bay Area, and many other places in North America.

Purpose 
Smoke Works advertises that smoking drugs, as opposed to injecting them, substantially lowers users' risk of getting HIV and hepatitis C, soft tissue infections, abscesses, vein damage, and endocarditis.

Smoke Works uses pipe distribution to connect with people who are otherwise excluded from medical and recovery services. United Nations Office on Drugs and Crime confirms that stimulant users are commonly excluded from services, stating, "While medical models of treatment for individuals with alcohol or opioid use disorders are well accepted and implemented worldwide, in most countries there is no parallel, long-term medical model of treatment for individuals with stimulant use disorders."

Smoke Works believes pipes reinforce autonomy for people who use drugs, making clients more likely to feel empowered to access care.

Public image and legality 
Smoke Works co-founder, Duffy, has stated he's had issues with a payment processor temporarily shutting Smoke Works' sales down. He has also shared excessive paperwork is required to keep the initiative going.

Backlash to alleged federal funding of pipes 
In April 2021, President Joe Biden made harm reduction a central pillar of his drug policy agenda and in December 2021 announced about $30 million in grants to “purchase equipment and supplies to enhance harm reduction efforts", listing "safer smoking kits" as an allowable example. This drew backlash from right-wing media and politicians, with The Washington Free Beacon publishing the article, "Biden Admin To Fund Crack Pipe Distribution To Advance 'Racial Equity'". Senators Tom Cotton of Arkansas and Ted Cruz of Texas advocated for legislation to bar federal funding for "crack pipes" and restrict federal funding for needle exchanges. Senators Marco Rubio of Florida and Joe Manchin of West Virginia introduced the bipartisan Preventing Illicit Paraphernalia for Exchange Systems (PIPES) Act . In response, White House officials clarified tax dollars would not be spent on pipes, and White House Press Secretary, Jen Psaki, told reporters that pipes “were never a part of the kit”.

In February 2022, Smoke Works founder, Jim Duffy, commented in the New York Times about how smoking kits can function as an early intervention tool to prevent people from injecting drugs, and to connect people to other resources. Duffy expressed disappointment regarding the uproar around pipes, saying the Biden administration was “baited into a conversation that doesn’t need to be validated." In a Bloomberg Law piece, Duffy reacted to the announcement that the $30 million in harm-reduction grant funds would not include funding glass pipes. Duffy expressed the announcement was unsurprising and a lost opportunity.

CBP seizure of inventory 
In August 2022, $5,000 of Smoke Works' "hammer" pipe (used for smoking heroin) inventory was lost to a U.S. Customs and Border Patrol seizure.  811 people signed a Change.org petition in support of the release of the inventory from U.S. Customs Border Patrol.

References 

Addiction medicine
Drug culture
Drug paraphernalia
Drug safety
Harm reduction
Medical hygiene
Medical prevention
Medical waste
Prevention of HIV/AIDS
United States federal policy
Public services of the United States
Addiction organizations in the United States
Drug policy of the United States
Drug policy organizations based in the United States
Drug-related deaths in the United States
Early warning systems
Organizations based in Massachusetts
Public health
Public health organizations
Vulnerable adults
Substance intoxication
Substance abuse
Substance abuse counselors
Civil liberties advocacy groups in the United States
Human rights organizations based in the United States
Political advocacy groups in the United States
Social justice organizations